"Treat Me Good" is a song written by Tania Doko, Joanne McDonnell and James Roche for Bachelor Girl's first album Waiting for the Day (1998). It was released as the album's second single in Australia on 5 October 1998 as a CD single. The song was a minor hit peaking in the top forty of the Australian ARIA Singles Chart, also peaking in the top thirty in New Zealand.

Track listing
CD single
 "Treat Me Good" - 4:32
 "Treat Me Good" (cyber mix) - 5:41
 "Someway, Somehow" - 5:14
 "Buses and Trains"  (live)  - 4:38

Charts

Release history

References

Bachelor Girl songs
1998 singles
1998 songs